Tengku Ahmad Tajuddin bin Tengku Abdul Jalil (born 5 January 1986) is a Malaysian field hockey player.

Tengku Ahmad is part of Malaysian 2010 Asian Games hockey squad that won the silver medal. Nicknamed as 'Zidane', Tengku Ahmad made his international senior debut in 2005. He also part of Malaysia's 2005 World Junior hockey squad.

Tengku Ahmad made his debut in the MHL in 2002 and featured for Sapura for one year before joining Ernst and Young, who became KL HC. In 2008, Tengku Ahmad had a stint with Dutch side Hilversum HC. In 2013, he joined Terengganu Hockey Team.

References

1986 births
Living people
People from Perlis
Malaysian people of Malay descent
Malaysian male field hockey players
Male field hockey forwards
Expatriate field hockey players
Malaysian expatriate sportspeople in the Netherlands
Commonwealth Games bronze medallists for Malaysia
Commonwealth Games medallists in field hockey
Field hockey players at the 2006 Asian Games
Field hockey players at the 2010 Asian Games
Field hockey players at the 2014 Asian Games
2014 Men's Hockey World Cup players
Field hockey players at the 2018 Asian Games
2018 Men's Hockey World Cup players
Asian Games silver medalists for Malaysia
Asian Games medalists in field hockey
Medalists at the 2010 Asian Games
Medalists at the 2018 Asian Games
Southeast Asian Games gold medalists for Malaysia
Southeast Asian Games medalists in field hockey
Field hockey players at the 2006 Commonwealth Games
Competitors at the 2013 Southeast Asian Games
Competitors at the 2017 Southeast Asian Games
Medallists at the 2006 Commonwealth Games